Clubul Sportiv Muncitoresc Borzești, commonly known as CSM Borzești was a Romania football club from Onești, Bacău County. In 1994 the club merged with Electromecon Onești to form FC Onești.

History
CSM Borzești was founded 1975 after the merger of Știința Bacău with CAROM Onești, the first one being absorbed by the second one. After the merge, CAROM was moved to Borzești, a village (now part of Onești) and renamed as CSM Borzești.

Honours
Divizia C
Winners (3): 1979–80, 1981–82, 1989–90
Runners-up (2): 1977–78, 1986–87

Liga IV – Bacău County
Winners (1): 1993–94

Other performances 
Appearances in Divizia B: 7
Appearances in Divizia C: 11
Best finish in Divizia B: 9th 1975–76

League history

Notable managers
  Teofil Codreanu
  Toader Șteț
  Ioan Sdrobiș

References

Football clubs in Bacău County
Association football clubs established in 1975
Association football clubs disestablished in 1994
Liga II clubs
Liga III clubs
Liga IV clubs
1975 establishments in Romania
1994 disestablishments in Romania